The 1st Alabama Cavalry Regiment was a cavalry regiment recruited from Southern Unionists that served in the Union Army during the American Civil War. It was the only predominantly-white Union regiment from Alabama. Of the 2,678 white Alabamians who enlisted in the Union Army, 2,066 served in the 1st Alabama Cavalry.

Service
The 1st Alabama Cavalry was raised from Alabama Unionists at Huntsville, Alabama and Memphis, Tennessee in October 1862 after Federal troops occupied the area. It was attached to the XVI Corps in various divisions until November 1864, when it became part of the XV Corps. During this time, its duties primarily consisted of scouting, raiding, reconnaissance, flank guard, and providing screening to the infantry while on the march.

The regiment was selected by Major General William T. Sherman to be his escort as he began his famous 1864 March to the Sea. It was assigned to the Third Division of the Cavalry Corps, Military Division of the Mississippi, in January 1865. It fought at the battles of Monroe's Crossroads and Bentonville and was present at the surrender of the Army of Tennessee at the Bennett Place. It was sent to the District of Northern Alabama, Department of the Cumberland, in June 1865.

The regiment was mustered out of service at Huntsville, Alabama, on October 20, 1865, with only 397 men present. Out of the 2,000 men who served in the unit during the war, 345 were killed in action, died in prison of disease or other non-battle causes, 88 were captured, and 279 deserted, with no accurate count of wounded.

Casualties
 Killed and mortally wounded: 5 officers, 482 enlisted men
 Died of disease: 1 officer, 13 enlisted men
 Wounded: 2 officers, 450 enlisted men
 Captured or missing: 0 officers, 0 enlisted men
 Total: 8 officers, 945 enlisted men

Commanders
 Colonel George Eliphaz Spencer

Reenactors
A unit in Jasper, Alabama portrayed Company C and was founded in 1992. It usually fights in reenactments as skirmishers.

Another unit based in Huntsville, Alabama, Company B, 4th Alabama Cavalry (CSA), portrays Company B, 1st Alabama Cavalry (USV) and participates in historical living history, skirmishes, and battles in Alabama, Tennessee, Georgia, and Mississippi. The unit participates as both dismounted and mounted cavalry troopers, representing the 1863 to 1865 period of the war.

See also
List of Alabama Union Civil War regiments

Notes

Further reading
 
 Hoole, William Stanley. Alabama Tories: The First Alabama Cavalry, U.S.A., 1862-1865 (Tuscaloosa, 1960)
 Rein, Christopher M. Alabamians in Blue: Freedmen, Unionists, and the Civil War in the Cotton State (Baton Rouge: LSU Press, 2019)

References
 The Civil War Archive
 Reenactors of Company C

Units and formations of the Union Army from Alabama
Military units and formations established in 1862
1862 establishments in Alabama
Military units and formations disestablished in 1865